El Regreso del Sobreviviente (English: The Return of the Survivor) is the second studio album (first one in 10 years as a solo artist), by Puerto Rican reggaeton artist Wisin. It is the sequel to his first studio album El Sobreviviente. It was released on March 18, 2014. The single released from the album was "Que Viva La Vida" on September 22, 2013. "Adrenalina" was the second single released for the album on February 25, 2014. "Claro" and "Heavy Heavy" were released as promotional singles.

Track listing

W version means that it's only Wisin. One version features an artist while the other only has him on it.

Charts

Weekly charts

Year-end charts

References

 iTunes information album

2014 albums
Sony Music Latin albums
Albums produced by Luny Tunes
Spanish-language albums
Wisin albums